Tapinoma minutissimum is an extinct Oligocene species of ant in the genus Tapinoma. Described by Emery in 1891, specimens of the species were found in Sicilian amber, whence a fossilised male of the species was described.

References

†
Fossil ant taxa
Oligocene insects
Hymenoptera of Europe
Prehistoric life of Europe
Fossil taxa described in 1891